The West Coast Treetop Walk is a canopy walkway through mature rimu forest near Hokitika on the West Coast of the South Island of New Zealand.

It passes close to the crowns of mature rimu trees and sits above smaller trees and tree ferns. The loop walk takes in views of the nearby Lake Mahinapua and includes a cantilever extending out into the forest canopy.

The tourist attraction is locally run via a 45-year concession lease from the Department of Conservation NZ and includes a car park and cafe, with the actual canopy walkway accessible via a 5-minute walk from the cafe.

References

External links

West Coast Treetop Walk & Cafe - Official web site

Tourist attractions in New Zealand
West Coast, New Zealand
Pedestrian bridges in New Zealand
Transport buildings and structures in the West Coast, New Zealand